"54321" is a song by American rapper Offset, released on August 19, 2022. It was produced by Baby Keem, with additional production from Mike Dean, Jahaan Sweet and Scott Bridgeway.

Background
Offset began teasing the song in January 2022. He confirmed its release in August 2022 by sharing multiple sneak peeks on Instagram before releasing it.

Composition
In the song, Offset raps in a rapid-fire flow, bragging about his accomplishments in life At one point, he references fellow Migos member Takeoff ("I'm outta here, five, four, three, two, one: Takeoff / Touch my brother, pull a gun").

Music video
The music video was released alongside the single. In it, Offset visits an amusement park and is all dressed in Balenciaga. He is seen spinning in rides, moonwalking down a midway, and enjoying salty and sugary snacks.

Live performances
On September 7, 2022, Offset performed a medley of "54321" and "Code" on The Tonight Show Starring Jimmy Fallon.

Charts

References

2022 singles
2022 songs
Offset (rapper) songs
Song recordings produced by Mike Dean (record producer)
Songs written by Offset (rapper)
Songs written by Mike Dean (record producer)